The Zebree Homestead is a prehistoric archaeological site in Mississippi County, Arkansas.   The site contains evidence of a Late Woodland Period village, and is most significant as oldest known site of the Mississippian culture south of St. Louis.  It appears to have been settled from Cahokia around 900 CE, with evidence of habitation and tool work, as well as a c. 1100 CE ditch and palisade.

The site was listed on the National Register of Historic Places in 1975.

See also
National Register of Historic Places listings in Mississippi County, Arkansas

References

Archaeological sites on the National Register of Historic Places in Arkansas
National Register of Historic Places in Mississippi County, Arkansas
Late Woodland period
Native American history of Arkansas
Former populated places in Arkansas